Mohamed Rashjid (born 15 August 1929) was an Indonesian former footballer. He competed in the men's tournament at the 1956 Summer Olympics.

References

External links
 
 

1929 births
Possibly living people
Indonesian footballers
Indonesia international footballers
Olympic footballers of Indonesia
Footballers at the 1956 Summer Olympics
Place of birth missing (living people)
Association football defenders
PSMS Medan players